Bovina Center Historic District is a national historic district located at Bovina Center in Delaware County, New York. The district contains 133 contributing buildings and one contributing structure.

It was listed on the National Register of Historic Places in 2000.

See also
National Register of Historic Places listings in Delaware County, New York

References

National Register of Historic Places in Delaware County, New York
Historic districts on the National Register of Historic Places in New York (state)
Historic districts in Delaware County, New York